The wildlife of the Lahore District of Pakistan includes a diverse range of natural and cultivated flora and fauna. The introduced flora of the city of Lahore comes from its cultural heritage as the regional capital of various Indian kingdoms from the 11th century to the early 20th century. Much of the Indian flora was introduced during the reign of Akbar, the third Mughal emperor.

Flora

Common trees of Lahore include:
Alstonia scholaris - locally termed ditabark - native to South Asia
Bombax ceiba- sunbal or silk cotton tree - native to the Himalayas
Callistemon citrinus - bottle brush - native to Australia
Dalbergia sissoo - shisham - native to South Asia
Delonix regia - gulmohar - native to Madagascar
Erythrina suberosa - coral or gul nister - native to Burma
Ficus benghalensis - banyan - native to Bangladesh
Ficus religiosa - pipal - native to South Asia
Ficus retusa - bobari - native to Malaysia
Kigelia africana - gul-e-fanoos or sausage - native to Africa
Livistona chinensis - bottle palm - native to China
Mangifera indica - aam - native to South Asia
Mimusops elengi - molsery - native to South Asia
Pongamia pinnata - sukh chayn or Indian beech - native to Himalayas
Syzygium cumini - jamu - native to South Asia
Ziziphus zizyphus - jujube - native to Himalayas

Fauna

Lahore Zoo is the main preserver of Lahore's fauna. Its animal exhibits include an aviary begun in 1872, a tiger house constructed in 1872 and renovated in 1987, an elephant house, a giraffe house, a deer house, a monkey house with both monkeys and great apes, crocodile ponds, and a snake house with various regional snakes, including the Indian cobra, Indian python, Indian sand boa and Russell's viper. Other popular wildlife centres are Jallo Park and Wildlife Safari Park.

Species list

Aves

Accipitriformes
Black kite
Golden eagle
Steppe eagle
Anseriformes
Bar-headed goose
Black swan
Common shelduck
Common teal
Eurasian wigeon
Gadwall
Greater white-fronted goose
Greylag goose (domestic goose)
Mallard
Muscovy duck
Mute swan
New Zealand scaup
Red shoveler
Ruddy shelduck
Wood duck
Columbiformes
Rock pigeon
Indian Fantail
Western crowned pigeon
Galliformes
Chukar partridge
Common pheasant
Emerald peafowl  hybrid of green pheasant and Indian pheasant
Golden pheasant
Yellow pheasant (mutation)
Green peafowl
Grey francolin
Grey partridge
Indian peafowl
Silver pheasant
Swinhoe's pheasant
Vulturine guineafowl
Wild turkey
Gruiformes
Demoiselle crane
Eurasian coot
Houbara bustard
Pelecaniformes
Dalmatian pelican
Great white pelican
Phoenicopteriformes
Greater flamingo
Lesser flamingo
Psittaciformes
Grey parrot
Alexandrine parakeet
Blossom-headed parakeet
Blue-and-yellow macaw
Budgerigar
Cape parrot
Lilian's lovebird
Little corella
Panama amazon
Red-and-green macaw
Rose-ringed parakeet
Sulphur-crested cockatoo
Struthioniformes
Emu
Ostrich
Southern cassowary

Mammals

Artiodactyla
Bactrian camel (2)
Blackbuck
Chinkara (Indian gazelle)
Chital (axis deer)
Dromedary camel
Fallow deer
Giraffe (2)
Hippopotamus (2)
Hog deer
Llama
Nilgai
Ovis orientalis
Mouflon (O. orientalis orientalis)
Urial (O. orientalis vignei)
Red deer
Sambar
Sika deer
Wild Boar
Carnivora
Asian black bear (2)
Bengal tiger
Cougar (puma)
European otter
Indian wolf
Jungle cat
Leopard
Lion
Lagomorpha
European rabbit
Marsupials
Red-necked wallaby
Perissodactyla
Plains zebra
White rhinoceros (2)
Primates
Black-footed gray langur
Capuchin monkey - unconfirmed
Chimpanzee (3)
Hamadryas baboon
Mandrill
Olive baboon
Rhesus macaque
Vervet monkey
Proboscidea
African bush elephant (1)
Rodentia
Guinea pig
Indian crested porcupine

Reptiles

Crocodilia
Gharial (Indian gavial)
Squamata
Central Asian cobra (brown cobra)
Common krait
Diadem snake (rat snake)
Enhydris - unidentified (water snake)
Indian cobra (spectacled cobra)
Indian python
Indian sand boa
Russell's viper
Saw-scaled viper
Testudines
Spur-thighed tortoise

Birds

Although Lahore has expanded in area, alongside modern additions to the city are the ancient monuments, old gardens, graveyards, traditional bungalows with attached gardens, large expanses of lawn and old roadside trees. These green areas and old endemic trees of Lahore are home to many resident birds as well as providing to seasonal migrants.  The grounds of different habitats such as Lahore Zoo and the Lawrence Gardens, Mayo and Jinnah Gardens, GOR, Jallo Park, Kinnaird College, Government College University, Aitchison College and many others are home to various bird species.

Ornithologists of preceding times documented the number of bird species in  Lahore. According to one study conducted in 1965 there were 240 bird species. In another study (1992) only 101 bird species from the parks of Lahore were  recorded. However, with an increase in the rate of urbanisation, the ecology of Lahore has been considerably affected and bird population reduced to 85, including both residents and migrants. Resident species include Indian grey hornbill, yellow-footed green pigeon, parakeets, bulbuls, doves, spotted owlet, Old World babblers, Old World flycatchers, mynas, woodpeckers, crows, black kites, ashy prinia, redstarts, warblers, red-wattled lapwing, kingfishers, and the Indian white-eye.

Three types of migratory birds are regular visitors to Punjab's provincial metropolis. These are winter visitors, summer visitors and transit migrants. The winter visitors come in September and stay until May. They come from northern latitudes and higher altitudes and include yellow-browed warbler, common starling, white wagtail, yellow wagtail and white-browed wagtail in search of food. The wagtails eat small insects, spiders, mollusks and soft seeds from moist soil. They roost in tall Typha and reed growth on the banks of ponds and lakes. Summer visitors arrive from southern parts of the country; these include Asian koel, purple sunbird, golden oriole and cuckoos. They also come here in search of food and for breeding. They stay in urban Lahore from March until September.

Changa Manga
The Changa Manga forest near Lahore is a hotspot for wildlife in Punjab. Wildlife within the borders of the plantation includes a small remnant populations of nilgai, hog deer, wild boar and possibly axis deer. Jackal and Asiatic wild cat can be found there as well. It also serves as a wildlife breeding center.  Changa Manga plantation is an important place for restocking projects of Asiatic vultures in Pakistan. A Gyps Vulture Restoration Program was started in 2006 by WWF-Pakistan to conserve and breed endangered species of Gyps, especially the white-rumped vulture.

References

Lahore
Lahore